The men's 200 metres at the 2018 European Athletics Championships took place at the Olympic Stadium on 8 and 9 August.

Records

Schedule

Competition format
The top ten ranked athletes by time during the season who entered the championships were given a bye into the semifinals.

Results

Round 1
First 3 in each heat (Q) and the next 2 fastest (q) advance to the semifinals.

Wind:Heat 1: +0.1 m/s, Heat 2: –0.1 m/s, Heat 3: +0.2 m/s, Heat 4: +0.2 m/s

Semifinals

First 2 (Q) and next 2 fastest (q) qualify for the final.

Wind:Heat 1: +0.3 m/s, Heat 2: +0.3 m/s, Heat 3: +0.3 m/s

*Athletes who received a bye to the semifinals

Final
Wind: +0.7 m/s

References
200m Men European Athletic Association

200 M
200 metres at the European Athletics Championships